Nowy horyzont is the first studio album by SBB, released in 1975 by Polskie Nagrania Muza. It was reissued by Metal Mind Productions in 2004 and 2005 with four additional tracks.

Track listing

Side A

Side B

Metal Mind Productions reissue bonus tracks

Personnel 
Source:

 Józef Skrzek – bass guitar, piano, synthesizer, Hammond organ, harmonica, vocals
 Antymos Apostolis – guitar
 Jerzy Piotrowski – drums

References

External links 

 Nowy Horyzont wyd. LP 1975 on babyblaue-seiten.de (German)
1975 albums
SBB (band) albums